Douglas George Greasley (20 January 1926 – 9 December 2011) was a professional cricketer who played for Northamptonshire between 1950 and 1955. He was a right-handed middle-order batsman and an irregularly-used slow left-arm spin bowler.

Never a first team regular, his highest first-class score and only century came against Leicestershire when he hit 102 not out in his second season.

References

External links

1926 births
2011 deaths
English cricketers
Northamptonshire cricketers
Sportspeople from Yorkshire